"On the Good Ship Lollipop" is a song composed by Richard A. Whiting with lyrics by Sidney Clare.  It was the signature song of child actress Shirley Temple. Temple first sang it in the 1934 film, Bright Eyes. 

In the song, the "Good Ship Lollipop" travels to a candy land.  The "ship" referred to in the song is an aircraft; the scene in Bright Eyes where the song appears takes place on a taxiing American Airlines Douglas DC-2.

400,000 copies of the sheet music, published by Sam Fox Publishing Company, were sold, and one recording by Mae Questel (the cartoon voice of Betty Boop and Olive Oyl) reputedly sold more than two million copies. It finished at #69 in the survey AFI's 100 Years...100 Songs of top tunes in cinema in the United States in June 2004.

The song was parodied on an episode of The Simpsons from May 2000, the episode being "Last Tap Dance in Springfield". It was being sung as "On the Spaceship Lollipop" by Vicki Valentine (voiced by Tress MacNeille) herself spoofing Temple. The actual song was used on an earlier episode, "Treehouse of Horror III", which aired in October 1992 in which Shirley Temple was seen singing it during her concert before being devoured by King Homer, the sketch parodying King Kong.
 
The song was also parodied on an episode of The Brady Bunch from February 1974, the episode being "The Snooperstar" in which Cindy becomes convinced that Mike's fussy client Penelope Fletcher (Natalie Schafer) is a talent scout and is trying to make her into the next Shirley Temple.

The moniker "Good Ship Lollipop" was famously used by Chicago Outfit underboss Ernest "Rocky" Infelice and his inner circle to refer to the Cicero Crew, which he ran in the mid-to-late 1980's with his second in command, Salvatore "Solly D" DeLaurentis. It is unknown as to how the crew gained the nickname.

In the 2007 film Shrek the Third, The Gingerbread Man is heard singing the song after Captain Hook threatens him.

Other recordings
1935: Rudy Vallee and His Connecticut Yankees, recorded for Victor on December 24, 1934 (Christmas Eve) (catalog No. 24838). This was very popular in 1935.
1935: Ted Fio Rito – recorded for Brunswick Records (catalog No. 7364) on August 1, 1935.
1952: Rosemary Clooney – on an unbreakable children’s record Columbia MJV138
1969: Tiny Tim covered the song, reaching #82 in Canada.
1980: Margaret Whiting (for her album Too Marvellous for Words).

References 

Songs from musicals
1934 songs
Songs with music by Richard A. Whiting
Music published by Bourne Co. Music Publishers
Songs with lyrics by Sidney Clare
Shirley Temple songs
Songs written for films